Sardinia 20Twenty (abbr. S20V) is a political party active in Sardinia, led by Stefano Tunis.

History
The party was founded in 2013 by Stefano Tunis (the director of the Regional Employment Agency). In 2014 In 2014 he left his position as director to run for the Regional Council among the ranks of Forza Italia and was elected with 5,433 votes.

In 2018 Tunis, leader of Sardinia 20Twenty, was indicated by Forza Italia as a possible candidate for the presidency of the region Sardinia in the upcoming regional elections in 2019. Eventually, Forza Italia supported the candidacy of Christian Solinas of the Sardinian Action Party. Solinas' candidacy (which later turned out to be a winner) was also supported by the party headed by Tunis, which obtained 4.1% of the votes and 3 seats.

Following the election, the councillors Domenico Gallus and Pietro Moro, elected together with Tunis among the ranks of S20V, decided to join the Union of the Centre.

Electoral results

Sardinian regional elections

References

External links
Official website 

Political parties in Sardinia
Political parties established in 2013
2013 establishments in Italy